Rareș Cucui (born 30 October 1993) is a Romanian former footballer who played as a defender for teams such as Universitatea Cluj and CSM Râmnicu Vâlcea, among others.

References

External links

1993 births
Living people
Romanian footballers
Association football defenders
Liga I players
Liga II players
FC Universitatea Cluj players
CS Sportul Snagov players
SCM Râmnicu Vâlcea players
CS Mioveni players